is a passenger railway station located in the town of Kotohira, Kagawa, Japan. It is operated by the private transportation company Takamatsu-Kotohira Electric Railroad (Kotoden) and is designated station "K20".

Lines
Enai Station is a statin on the Kotoden Kotohira Line and is located 31.6 km from the opposing terminus of the line at Takamatsu-Chikkō Station.

Layout
The station consists of one side platform serving a single bi-directional track. The platform is compatible with 4-car formations of 18 meter-class carriages of the Kotohira Line. The station is unattended.

Adjacent stations

History
Enai Station opened on March 15, 1927 as a station of the Kotohira Electric Railway. On November 1, 1943 it became  a station on the Takamatsu Kotohira Electric Railway Kotohira Line due to a company merger.

Surrounding area
Kotohira Town Enoki Elementary School
Kagawa Prefectural Agricultural College

Passenger statistics

See also
 List of railway stations in Japan

References

External links

  

Railway stations in Japan opened in 1927
Railway stations in Kagawa Prefecture
Kotohira, Kagawa